ISPO is the Shortcut for:
Internationale Fachmesse für Sportartikel und Sportmode
International Simultaneous Policy Organization
International Society for Prosthetics and Orthotics